Leninaul is the name of several rural localities in the Republic of Dagestan, Russia:
Leninaul, Kazbekovsky District, Republic of Dagestan, a selo in Kazbekovsky District
Leninaul, Nogaysky District, Republic of Dagestan, a selo in Arslanbekovsky Selsoviet of Nogaysky District